Undrafted is a 2016 sports comedy-drama film. It is the directorial debut of Joseph Mazzello, who also wrote, co-produced and starred in the film. It also stars Aaron Tveit, Tyler Hoechlin, Chace Crawford and Philip Winchester. It is based on the true story of Mazzello's brother who missed out on the Major League Baseball draft. The film was released on July 15, 2016, by Vertical Entertainment.

The film was executive produced by Tony Romo, who was an undrafted free agent before being signed by the Dallas Cowboys of the National Football League.

Plot
A summer-league baseball team called the DBs (for Diamondbacks) is in the league semifinals. Maz, one of their players, decides to play despite the disappointment of finding out minutes earlier he was not drafted. The opposing team, the Bulldogs, have ringers so the DBs will have to play extra hard to win. The DBs manage to keep the Bulldogs from scoring until the final inning. Pitcher Dells loses his confidence and gives up several runs. The DBs must play perfectly in their final inning, and by some miracle, Maz becomes the hero of the game.

Cast

Joseph Mazzello as Pat Murray
Aaron Tveit as John "Maz" Mazzello
Tyler Hoechlin as Jonathan "Dells" Dellamonica 
Chace Crawford as Arthur Barone
Philip Winchester as Fotch
Jim Belushi as Joey
Manny Montana as Zapata
Matt Bush as David Stein
Michael Fishman as Antonelli
Duke Davis Roberts as Ty Dellamonica
Matt Barr as Anthony
Billy Gardell as Umpire Haze
Ryan Pinkston as Jonathan Garvey
Toby Hemingway as Palacco
Jay Hayden as Vinnie
David Del Rio as Tree
Michael Consiglio as Dave Schwartz
Justin Matthew Gallegos as Baseball Player
Rick Iwasaki as Baseball Player
Zachary Scott Green as Baseball Player

Production

Pre-production
Mazzello wrote the screenplay based on events in his brother's life. "I watched for 15 years as my brother worked tirelessly to make his dream come true only to see it never happen and it was heartbreaking [...] During that time I saw the love he and his teammates had for each other and for the game; that is the heart of our story."

Filming
Principal photography took place in Dunsmore Park, La Crescenta-Montrose, California from September 2013 to October 8, 2013.

Release
On June 2, 2014, Mazzello announced via Twitter that he had "finally finished editing my film". In February 2016, Vertical Entertainment acquired worldwide distribution rights to the film. The film was scheduled to be released on July 15, 2016.

Marketing
The first official poster was released on Mazzello's Twitter on February 17, 2015.

Reception 
On Rotten Tomatoes, the film has a score of 14%, based on 7 reviews, with an average rating of 4.3/10. On Metacritic, there are three "unfavorable" reviews out of three, and the average rating is 31/100.  Writing in the Hollywood Reporter, Frank Scheck stated "Undrafted never manages to make us care about its overgrown adolescent characters and whether or not they win the game. It’s a fatal flaw in a sports movie, even if several of the young actors demonstrate real athletic skills. Film critic Brian Orndorf described the movie as "an itchy valentine to the world of intramural baseball". Nivk Schager also panned the film in The Village Voice, writing "there’s no escaping the fact that the dugout-and-diamond shenanigans are consistently tedious." Steve Green wrote in Indiewire, " "Undrafted” tries to make a ragtag baseball team from a bevy of players with quirks dialed up so high they overwhelm every other aspect of the film," and concludes, "this is standard-issue sports fare that still seems intent on grafting unnecessary piles of story on top. Todd Jorgenson's review stated, "The errors outnumber the hits in this heartfelt ensemble drama," stating that the film was sunk by "an off-putting collection of characters who become tiresome, both on and off the field. Critic Frank Swietek wrote, "despite the best efforts of a game cast, the movie definitely comes across as a bush-league effort."

Michael Rechtshaffen gave Undrafted a mixed review in the Los Angeles Times, calling the film "an amiable if aimless ensemble comedy that's unable to overcome its amateur status...the greatest challenge being faced turns out to be not knowing what story to tell."

References

External links

2016 films
2010s biographical films
2016 independent films
2010s sports comedy-drama films
American biographical films
American sports comedy-drama films
American baseball films
Biographical films about sportspeople
Films set in Los Angeles
Films shot in California
Vertical Entertainment films
Cultural depictions of baseball players
2016 directorial debut films
2010s English-language films
2010s American films